Jimmy Mullen (born 18 November 1993) is an English professional golfer.

Mullen is from Devon, England. Playing as an amateur, he made the cut at the 2013 Open Championship. He and Matt Fitzpatrick were the only two amateurs to make the cut. He played on the Great Britain and Ireland team in the 2015 Walker Cup, winning all four of his matches.

Mullen turned professional later in 2015 and made his professional debut at the Alfred Dunhill Links Championship.

Amateur wins
2014 The Duncan Putter
2015 Welsh Open Stroke Play Championship

Source:

Results in major championships

"T" = tied

Team appearances
Amateur
European Amateur Team Championship (representing England): 2015
Walker Cup (representing Great Britain & Ireland): 2015 (winners)

References

External links

English male golfers
Sportspeople from Bideford
1993 births
Living people